Joseph Charles Benziger (1762–1841) was the founder of the Catholic publishing house which bears his surname. He was president of the Austrian Feldkirch county.

Biography
He was born in 1762 in Einsiedeln, Switzerland. In 1792 he started a small business in religious articles, but he soon felt the effects of the French Revolution. The French invasion of Switzerland forced him to take flight with his family, and for about a year they resided at Feldkirch, Austria, where his eldest son, Charles, was born. In 1800 they returned to Einsiedeln, which had been devastated by pillage and army requisitions. All Mr. Benziger's modest fortune was gone, but with redoubled efforts he set about repairing his losses, and started in business as a bookseller. He was made president of the county, and his credit and personal financial sacrifices proved of great help, especially during the famine of 1817. In 1833, his sons, Charles and Nicholas, succeeded him in the book-selling business.

See also
Benziger Brothers

External links

References

Swiss publishers (people)
Swiss booksellers
1762 births
1841 deaths
19th-century Swiss businesspeople
People from Einsiedeln